Xeglun is the celestial elk in Tungusic mythology.  It was Mangi (Xargi)'s pursuit of this creature that was said to have created the Milky Way.

References
Yves Bonnefoy, Wendy Doniger, Asian Mythologies, at Google Books
David Leeming, The Oxford Companion to World Mythology, at Google Books

Mythological deer
Asian legendary creatures
Tungusic mythology